Hargrave is an English surname that may refer to:

Bert Hargrave (1917–1996), Canadian politician
Bob Hargrave (1920–2014), former American footballer
Bubbles Hargrave (1892–1969), American baseball player
Christopher Hargrave (born 1951), Australian cricketer
David A. Hargrave (1946–1986), American game designer and writer
Francis Hargrave (c.1741–1821), English lawyer and antiquary
John Hargrave (jurist) (1815–1885), Australian politician, jurist
Javon Hargrave (born 1993), American footballer 
John Hargrave (1894–1982) or White Fox, British youth leader and politician
Joseph James Hargrave (1841–1894), Canadian trader, author, and journalist
Lawrence Hargrave (1850–1915), Australian aviation pioneer
Letitia MacTavish Hargrave (1813–1854), Scottish writer
Margaret Packham Hargrave (born 1941), Australian writer
Pinky Hargrave (1896–1942), American baseball player
Richard Hargrave (1817–1905), Australian politician
Rudolph Hargrave (1925–2014), American jurist
Ryan Hargrave (born 1981), Australian rules footballer
William Hargrave (died 1751), Governor of Gibraltar

See also 
 Hargrave (disambiguation)
 Hargraves
 Hargreave (surname)
 Hargreaves (surname)